Abdalan (also Romanized as Abdālān; also known as ‘Abdehlān) is a village in Khorram Rud Rural District, in the Central District of Tuyserkan County, Hamadan Province, Iran. At the 2006 census, its population was 431, in 111 families.

References 

Populated places in Tuyserkan County